3-Oxopentanoic acid, or beta-ketopentanoate, is a 5-carbon ketone body.  It is made from odd carbon fatty acids in the liver and rapidly enters the brain.
  
As opposed to 4-carbon ketone bodies, beta-ketopentanoate is anaplerotic, meaning it can refill the pool of TCA cycle intermediates. The triglyceride triheptanoin is used clinically to produce beta-ketopentanoate.

References

Beta-keto acids
Carboxylic acids